Guo Jiayu (born 27 August 2004) is a Chinese footballer currently playing as a goalkeeper for Guangzhou.

Career statistics

Club
.

References

2004 births
Living people
Chinese footballers
Association football goalkeepers
Guangzhou F.C. players
21st-century Chinese people